Kia Sara or Kiya Sara or Keya Sara may refer to:
 Kia Sara, Lahijan
 Kia Sara, Rasht
 Kia Sara, Rudsar